Fogg Highland is an ice-covered upland,  long and  wide, on the Black Coast of Palmer Land, Antarctica, terminating on the northeast in Cape Herdman and bounded on the north by Violante Inlet and on the south by Clowes Glacier.

The feature was photographed from the air by the United States Antarctic Service in 1940, the Ronne Antarctic Research Expedition (RARE) in 1947, and the U.S. Navy, 1965–67. It was surveyed by the joint RARE – Falklands Islands Dependencies Survey sledge party in November 1947, and was named in 1981 by the UK Antarctic Place-Names Committee after Gordon Elliott Fogg, Professor of Marine Biology, University College of North Wales, 1971–85, who conducted research in the Antarctic Peninsula area in conjunction with the British Antarctic Survey (BAS) in 1966, 1974, and 1979. He was Chairman of the BAS Scientific Advisory Committee, 1970–86.

References 

Landforms of Palmer Land